Ahamus lijiangensis is a species of moth of the family Hepialidae. It was described by Hong-Fu Chu and Lin-Yao Wang in 1985 and is known from Yunnan, China.

References

External links
Hepialidae genera

Moths described in 1985
Hepialidae
Moths of Asia